Rosa María Andrés / Andreea Vanc were the defending champions.

Seeds

Draw

References

 Draws 

2006 Internationaux de Strasbourg Singles
2006 WTA Tour
2006 in French tennis